Ranjani Hebbar Guruprasad (1981 - 9 June 2013) was an Indian Carnatic music vocalist. Now her two disciples, Vid. Archana and Vid. Samanvi are propagating the music following their path shown by their Guru.

Early life
Ranjani Hebbar was born in Udupi to Aravind Hebbar, a Botany Professor and Vasanthalakshmi. She started learning music from her parents and Madhoor Balasubramaniam and become the first disciple of  S. Sowmya and Srinivasan, Sowmya's father. She continued to study under Chengalpet Ranganathan and Completed her post graduation in Carnatic Music from Madras University. She married Guruprasad, a Software Engineer.

Professional career
She was an A-Grade artist on All India Radio and has performed on many stages in South India, including on national television.

Death
Ranjani Hebbar died of Cancer on June 9, 2013, in KMC Hospital, Manipal.

Awards and titles
Kalki Award
Isai Chudar
M S Subbulakshmi scholarship

References

1983 births
2013 deaths
Women Carnatic singers
Carnatic singers
Indian women classical singers
People from Udupi
Singers from Karnataka
Women musicians from Karnataka
21st-century Indian women singers
21st-century Indian singers